Ronnie Reniers (born 8 November 1987) is a Dutch footballer who plays as a winger for Dessel Sport. He formerly played for Willem II, FC Den Bosch, PEC Zwolle and FC Eindhoven.

Reniers is a forward who was born in Tilburg and made his debut in professional football, being part of the Willem II squad in the 2006–07 season.

References

External links
 Voetbal International profile 

1987 births
Living people
Dutch footballers
Eredivisie players
Eerste Divisie players
Willem II (football club) players
FC Den Bosch players
PEC Zwolle players
FC Eindhoven players
K.F.C. Dessel Sport players
People from Oisterwijk
Footballers from Tilburg
Association football wingers
Footballers from North Brabant
Dutch expatriate sportspeople in Belgium
Dutch expatriate footballers
Expatriate footballers in Belgium